Kashin (masculine) or Kashina (feminine) may refer to:

People
Kashin (surname)

Places
Kashin (town), a town in Tver Oblast, Russia
 Anna of Kashin (1280–1368), a princess of Kashin from the Rurik Dynasty
Kashin, Iran, a village in Hamadan Province, Iran
Kashina (village), a village in Blagoevgrad Province, Bulgaria

Other uses
Kashin, a feudal retainer in Japan
Kashin class destroyer, a Soviet guarding ship
Mod Kashin class destroyer, an updated version of the Kashin class
Kashin (elephant) (1968–2009), an elephant at Auckland Zoo
Kachina dolls, a spirit beings in western Puebloan cosmology and religious practices
Hopi Kachina dolls, created by artists of the Hopi pueblos